Françoise Thébaud  (born 1952) is a French historian, professor emeritus of history, and specialist in the history of women. In 2017, she was awarded the Chevalier of the Légion d'honneur.

Early life and education
Françoise Thébaud was born in 1952.

She studied at the École normale supérieure de lettres et sciences humaines, and completed a 3rd cycle thesis entitled  (When our grandmothers gave life: motherhood in France in the interwar period). She completed the Agrégation d'histoire in 1975.

Career and research
Thébaud was a teacher-researcher from 1985 to 1997 at Lumière University Lyon 2 and then, in 1995, presented a university habilitation dissertation in history entitled  (Writing the history of women: assessments and perspectives), at Lumière University Lyon 2. She served as professor of contemporary history at Avignon University, from 1997 to 2007, before assuming the title of professor emeritus.
 history of feminisms and feminists
 social and political history of motherhood
 writing and epistemology of history: from the history of women to the history of gender

In her book  (When Our Grandmothers Gave Life) (1986), Thébaud draws on censuses, demographic and economic statistics, medical theses, obstetrics and childcare manuals, to reconstruct the experience of motherhood. She shows in particular that pronatalist propaganda pushes women to be convinced that childbearing is a national duty, at the same time as an accomplishment of their nature. In her review of the book, the historian Marie-France Morel writes that Thébaud proposes "new issues in the history of women", as well as a questioning of the medical power and the functioning of maternities.

In 1995, she co-founded the history journal, Clio. Femmes, genre, histoire, serving as its co-director from 1995 to 2012. Until 2009, she served as president of the  association for the development of the history of women and gender. 

Her  (Paris: Stock, 1986; revised ed. 2014), is considered the classic work regarding the experience of French women during World War I.

Awards and honours
 2017, Chevalier of the Légion d'honneur

Selected works

Books

Articles

References

Bibliography 
 

1952 births
Living people
20th-century French historians
21st-century French historians
Avignon University
Women's studies academics
Women's historians
Chevaliers of the Légion d'honneur